The National Native American Boarding School Healing Coalition (NABS) is a nonprofit created in June 2012 and is composed of more than eighty organizations that are dedicated to healing Native American communities affected by Indian Boarding Schools in the United States.

History
The idea for NABS sprang out a symposium held in 2011. Participants at the symposium decided that the United States needed an organization to raise awareness about the autocracies that occurred at boarding schools for Native American children as a result of the Civilization Fund Act. NABS was initially a subsidiary under the Native American Rights Fund (NARF) but gained independence in 2015.

Advocacy
In April 2019, NABS, in connection with several other Native American rights organizations and led by the International Indian Treaty Council, filed a claim with the UN Working Group against Enforced and Involuntary Disappearances in regards to indigenous children who went missing while attending American Indian boarding schools. The following month, NABS and the other organizations testified before the United Nations and urged that the U.N. to encourage the United States to investigate what happened to the missing native children.

Strategic Plans
In January 2020, NABS announced a detailed strategic plan to take place over the next ten years (ending in 2030.) The plan relies on addressing four main issues: "establishing a national truth and healing center, developing curriculum, producing a documentary series, creating a national digital archive and issuing policy statements that support the work of tribes and other agencies related to boarding schools." The strategic plan was made possible by a donation from the Kendeda Fund amounting to $10 million.

Other strategic goals by NABS including engaging the Native American community in conversations with local and national governments and advocate for policies to document the history of the Native American boarding schools and their impact on the communities. NABS also seeks to engage churches into taking responsibility for their role in the ethnocide of Native American culture, and genocide of Native American children.

Causes

In 2020, in response to the COVID-19 pandemic, NABS worked with the Tulalip tribe in Washington to create care packages for American Indian elders who survived going through the American Indian boarding schools system. The We Love You! project sent 1,000 care packages to elders or their descendants. The care package idea was the idea of Deborah Parker, a well-know Tulalip tribe member. Each box contained different items, all from Native American companies, and included items like sage bundles, coloring books, N95 masks, and medicine bags.

NABS has also collaborated with the National Indian Education Association to create "a 12-module curriculum targeted to teachers and educators" targeting the detrimental and long-standing effects stemming from cultural ethnocide. The program is geared toward Native American educators, students, and community members.

In June 2021, Chief Executive of NABS, Christine Diindiisi McCleave, supported the creation of the Federal Indian Boarding School Initiative that will investigate records and search for buried children on the grounds of the old boarding schools. NABS also released an official press statement on their website supporting the initiative

References

Native American rights organizations
Organizations established in 2012
Organizations based in Minneapolis